Consort Feng may refer to:

Feng Yuan (died 6 BC), concubine of Emperor Yuan of Han
Empress Dowager Feng (442–490), wife of Emperor Wencheng of Northern Wei
Feng Qing ( 5th century), first wife of Emperor Xiaowen of Northern Wei
Feng Run (died 499), second wife of Emperor Xiaowen of Northern Wei
Feng Xiaolian (died 581?), concubine of Gao Wei (penultimate emperor of Northern Qi)
Empress Feng (Later Jin) ( 10th century), wife of Shi Chonggui (last emperor of Later Jin)